René Pellos (born René Marcel Pellarin, 22 January 1900, Lyon – 8 April 1998, Cannes) was a French artist, cartoonist and writer who worked in the Franco-Belgian bandes dessinées (BD) tradition. He also competed in the men's tournament at the 1928 Summer Olympics, representing Switzerland.

References

External links
Biography at Lambiek's Comiclopedia

1900 births
1998 deaths
French cartoonists
French comics artists
French sports journalists
Cycling journalists
Artists from Lyon
Grand Prix de la ville d'Angoulême winners
Swiss male field hockey players
Olympic field hockey players of Switzerland
Field hockey players at the 1928 Summer Olympics